The 1984 All Japan Endurance Championship was the second season of the All Japan Sports Prototype Championship. The 1984 champion was the Auto Beaurex Motorsport Lotec M1C-BMW driven by Naoki Nagasaka.

Schedule
All races were held in Japan.

Season results
Season results are as follows:

Point Ranking

Drivers

References

External links
 1984 全日本耐久レース選手権 

JSPC seasons
All Japan Endurance
All Japan Endurance